The Ninth Circle is a 1960 Yugoslavian film directed by France Štiglic. The story revolves around the Croatian Ustaše concentration camp named The Ninth Circle, based on the infamous Jasenovac concentration camp. It was nominated for the Academy Award for Best Foreign Language Film. It was also entered into the 1960 Cannes Film Festival.

Plot
In the early 1940s, following the German invasion of Yugoslavia and creation of the Ustaše-run Croatian Nazi puppet state, citizens of Zagreb are facing many hardships. Things are especially difficult for the Jewish population that's marked for extermination.

In order to save Ruth, a Jewish girl, from the Nazis and their collaborators, a Croatian Catholic family arranges for her to marry their young son, Ivo. The young man, despite understanding the necessity of this arrangement, is unhappy with this sudden end to his careless youth and at first seems to dislike the girl, dismissing her as "a mere child" and continuing to go out with his best friend Magda, who he is also romantically interested in. Magda, who is aware of his marriage, quickly seeks to distance herself from his advances, and when a drunk Ivo calls her to his bachelor party, resulting in a highly uncomfortable situation for her, their prospective relationship ends. Angered by this, Ivo has an emotional outbreak upon returning home, causing Ruth to run out into the dark streets, where she attempts to deliberately expose herself to a passing patrol, only to be saved at the last second by Ivo's father.

Ivo himself comes to the realization that his behaviour to this point has not only been reckless and selfish, but also dangerous, displaying a high degree of ignorance regarding the true severity of the situation. Following this epiphany, he soon comes to form a closer emotional relationship with his wife, spending time with her and even taking her out to a park, despite Jews not being allowed to do this. Things take a turn for the worse, however, when a member of the Ustaše who has previously lived in the same house as Ruth recognizes and publicly humiliates her by forcing her to clean his shoes. The situation is only de-escalated when Zvonko, one of Ivo's classmates who has also joined the Ustaše, notices him and tells the man to let them go. Zvonko later bullies Ivo in class by marking his coat with the letter Ž, which stands for Židovi, the Croatian word for Jew. When Ruth sees this, she is terrified, and Ivo tries to calm her down by marking several objects in the room around them with the same symbol, calling it "just a letter". He also gives her a miniature park to make up for her not being able to go there anymore.

During a bomb alert, the streets are deserted, and Ruth uses this opportunity to go out on her own and enjoy a rare moment of freedom and levity. Her joy soon turns to ashes, however, as she sees her father's name on a bulletin board, indicating that he was hanged, which causes her to break down crying. The alarm ends and people return to the streets, and when an officer notices Ruth, he asks her for her last name, which she gives as Alakalaj, despite her legal last name now being Vojnović. He then proceeds to restrain her.

Ivo, who unsuccessfully went out to look for her, fears the worst, and, against the pleas of his parents, decides to sneak into the local concentration camp. He asks several inmates before a woman points out the possibility of Ruth being held in the infamous Ninth Circle, which she also refers to as "harem". Ivo, now moving closer to the camp's centre, encounters his former friend Zvonko, who works as a guard there and cynically attempts to paint life in the camp in a positive light. They come across a group of children with a man talking them into entering a car, but when the doors close, Ivo horrifiedly notices a gas cylinder labelled with a skull, realizing that the car is in fact a gas van.

As they approach the Ninth Circle, Zvonko tells Ivo that all the women there are due to be murdered this very night, adding that he might have "one last go" at Ruth before that, which causes Ivo to knock him unconscious or possibly kill him. When he then enters the central building, he bears witness to the grotesque spectacle going on inside——cheerful music is playing and men and women are dancing, but the men are Ustaše officers who cruelly make a point to step on the terrified women's unclothed feet. Ivo sees Ruth, and as the women are rushed out, he grabs her and flees to hide in an empty guard tower, where they share a moment of intimacy. As the power on the barbed wire surrounding the area is said to be switched off at midnight to remove the dead bodies from it, they decide to wait until then, planning to use this short period of time to escape. When the hour finally arrives, however, Ruth, who climbed after Ivo and still wears no shoes, finds herself unable to pass the fence, and Ivo, who had already reached the other side and could have saved his life very easily, rather decides to stay with her. The film ends with a close-up shot of a light being turned back on, implying that both Ruth and Ivo were killed.

Critical reception

The Ninth Circle was nominated for the Golden Palm in Cannes and for an Oscar for best foreign language film.

The film was also released in more than 30 countries, including the U.S., the Soviet Union, France, Italy, Great Britain, Germany, Israel, Argentina, Australia, and Japan.

The Croatian Film Association's database describes The Ninth Circle as "the most beautiful and the most moving war melodrama of Croatian cinema". In 1999, a poll of Croatian film critics found it to be one of the best Croatian films ever made.

Contemporary commentator Jurica Pavičić calls The Ninth Circle "the most important Croatian film about the Holocaust", pointing out that it represents the first acknowledgement of the Jasenovac camp in all of Croatian cinema. However, he also calls the film "old-fashionedly expressive", noting that from a modern perspective, the viewing experience seems "archaic", especially in regards to aspects like shot composition and its inappropriately ostentatious soundtrack. The film's position as a landmark in Balkan cinema history remains undisputed.

Cast 
 Boris Dvornik as Ivo Vojnović
 Dušica Žegarac as Ruth Alakalaj
 Dragan Milivojević as Zvonko
 Branko Tatić as Ivo's father
  as Ivo's mother
 Beba Lončar as Magda
  as Tetka

See also
 List of submissions to the 33rd Academy Awards for Best Foreign Language Film
 List of Yugoslav submissions for the Academy Award for Best Foreign Language Film

References

External links

Serbo-Croatian-language films
1960 films
Holocaust films
Films about anti-fascism
Films directed by France Štiglic
Films shot in Croatia
Jadran Film films
Films set in Zagreb
Films set in Croatia
Films set in Yugoslavia
War films set in Partisan Yugoslavia